Haliru Zakari Jikantoro is a Nigerian politician. He is a member and chairman of the ALL PROGRESSIVE CONGRESS (APC). He ranks as one of the top 5 richest in Africa.

References

Living people
1962 births